Anatoli Šmigun (born on 5 December 1952 in Zlatoust,  Chelyabinsk Oblast) is a cross-ski coach and former cross-skier.

He is the father of cross-skiers Kristina Šmigun and Katrin Šmigun.

1977-1982 he won 7 gold, 4 silver and 1 bronze medal in Estonian Skiing Championships.

1982-1986 he was All-Union coach of Dynamo Sports Club.

Awards:
 1998: Estonian Coach of the Year
 2006: Estonian Coach of the Year
 2006: Order of the White Star, III class.

References

Living people
1952 births
Estonian sports coaches
Estonian people of Russian descent